Brigadier Sultan Amir Tarar, best known as Colonel Imam, (died 23 January 2011) was a one-star rank army general in the Pakistan Army, and a former diplomat who served as the Consul-General of Pakistan at Herat, Afghanistan. He belonged to the Tarar Gotra of Jutts.
Amir Sultan Tarar was a Pakistan Army officer and special warfare operation specialist. He was a member of the SSG of the army, an intelligence officer of the ISI and served as Pakistani Consul General in Herat, Afghanistan. A veteran of the Soviet–Afghan War, he is widely believed to have played a key role in the formation of the Taliban, after having helped train the Afghan Mujahidin on behalf of the United States in the 1980s.

"Colonel Imam" as Tarar was also known, was a commando-guerrilla warfare specialist, and trained Mullah Omar and other Taliban factions and leaders. Colonel Imam remained active in Afghanistan's civil war until the 2001 United States led War on Terrorism, and supported the Taliban publicly through media.

Tarar was kidnapped along with fellow ISI officer Khalid Khawaja and British journalist Asad Qureshi and Qureshi's driver Rustam Khan on 26 March 2010. Khawaja was killed a month later. Qureshi and Khan were released in September 2010. Amir Sultan Tarar was killed in January 2011.

Education and military career
Amir Sultan Tarar was a graduate from the PMA and from Fort Bragg. After he graduated from the Pakistan Military Academy, he joined the Pakistan Army's 15th Frontier Force Regiment as 2nd Lieutenant. Amir Sultan Tarar was sent to the United States in 1974, and was trained among the United States Army Special Forces. Upon his graduation from the Special Forces School, Amir Sultan Tarar was awarded the American Green beret by his training commander. Following his return to Pakistan, Amir Sultan Tarar joined the Special Service Group (SSG). In the 1980s, he participated in the Soviet–Afghan War. Colonel Imam, as he became known, was increasingly involved in Afghanistan's politics even after the Soviet withdrawal from Afghanistan. After the Soviet–Afghan War, Colonel Imam supported and trained Taliban fighters independently. It was alleged even in the 2000s that he still independently supported the Taliban independence movement in Afghanistan. He was a disciple of Ameer Muhammad Akram Awan, the current sheikh of silsila Naqshbandia Owaisia.

Relationships with United States
After the dissolution of the Soviet Union, Amir Sultan Tarar was invited to the White House by the then President George Herbert Walker Bush, and was given a piece of the Berlin Wall with a brass plaque inscribed: "To the one who dealt the first blow." In the 2000s, Western intelligence agencies believed Colonel Imam was dead among a group of renegade officers from Pakistan's ISI who continued to help the Taliban after Pakistan turned against them following the attacks of September 11, 2001.

Authentic knowledge about Amir Sultan Tarar
Little is known of Amir Sultan Tarar's true history or operational profile as an agent of the ISI. Most information about 'Colonel Imam' was generated by his own admission, as well as news media speculation. Pakistan's secrecy over internal and external security, plus the code of conduct of Pakistan Armed Forces personnel serving in sensitive institutions, prevents such details from being available or verifiable. In 2010, however, Amir Sultan Tarar gave interviews to foreign and domestic journalists in Rawalpindi.

Tarar's initial objective, after the Mujahedin infighting after Soviet withdrawal and before his involvement with Taliban, were unclear; his objectives at that time were just to find new friends for Pakistan from where to operate later, such as Akhaundzada of Helmand who had a blood feud with Hikmatyar and was a warlord with 17000 men under command.

According to Colonel Imam's own claims, Soviets when in Afghanistan had put a 200 million Afghani bounty on him. He also claimed that, when he presented operational details to Aslam Baig after General Zia's death about anti-soviet struggle, the later was surprised as to the extent. In Cathey Schofield's book Inside Pakistan Army, Colonel Imam admitted meeting Osama Bin Laden in 1986.

Kidnapping and execution
In March 2010, Colonel Imam, former ISI officer Khalid Khawaja, journalist Asad Qureshi, and Qureshi's driver Rustman Khan were abducted by an unknown militant group which called itself Asian Tigers. Khawaja's body was found near a stream in Karam Kot in April 2010 with a note attached saying he was with the CIA and ISI, about seven kilometres south of North Waziristan's main town of Mirali. Qureshi and Khan were freed in September 2010.

Colonel Imam was executed in captivity, as documented in a video released by Tehreek-i-Taliban Pakistan. Both the Haqqani network and the Afghan Taliban were purportedly against the execution. Colonel Imam's captors refused to release his body to his family unless a ransom was paid.

References

Year of birth missing
Punjabi people
People from Chakwal District
Pakistani Muslims
Pakistan Army officers
Frontier Force Regiment officers
Pakistani expatriates in the United States
Special Services Group officers
People of the Soviet–Afghan War
Pakistani anti-communists
Assassinated Pakistani diplomats
2011 deaths
Military government of Pakistan (1977–1988)
Military personnel killed in the insurgency in Khyber Pakhtunkhwa
People of Inter-Services Intelligence
People killed by the Tehrik-i-Taliban Pakistan
Pakistani expatriates in Afghanistan
Pakistani Islamists